Oveng is a town and commune in the South Province of Cameroon.  It is located on the Kam River near the southern border with Equatorial Guinea and near the Ntem River.

Gallery

See also
Communes of Cameroon

References
 Site de la primature - Élections municipales 2002 
 Contrôle de gestion et performance des services publics communaux des villes camerounaises - Thèse de Donation Avele, Université Montesquieu Bordeaux IV 
 Charles Nanga, La réforme de l’administration territoriale au Cameroun à la lumière de la loi constitutionnelle n° 96/06 du 18 janvier 1996, Mémoire ENA. 

Populated places in South Region (Cameroon)
Communes of Cameroon